Fary Komul (born 1 March 1987) is an Indonesian professional footballer who plays as a central midfielder. Previously he played for Aceh United and Persija Jakarta.

Honours

Club
Persiraja Banda Aceh
 Liga 2 third place (play-offs): 2019
Persis Solo
 Liga 2: 2021

References

External links
 Fary Komul at Soccerway
 Fary Komul at Liga Indonesia

1987 births
Association football midfielders
Living people
People from Lhokseumawe
Sportspeople from Aceh
Indonesian footballers
Liga 1 (Indonesia) players
Persiraja Banda Aceh players
Indonesian Premier Division players